The Ministry of Humanitarian Affairs and Disaster Management is a ministry of the Government of South Sudan. The incumbent minister is Peter Mayen as of feb 2020.

List of Ministers of Humanitarian Affairs and Disaster Management

References

Humanitarian Affairs and Disaster Management
South Sudan, Humanitarian Affairs and Disaster Management